Human Racing is the debut studio album by English singer-songwriter Nik Kershaw, released on 27 February 1984 by MCA Records. Several songs like "Drum Talk" were based around improvisation; other songs, like "I Won't Let the Sun Go Down on Me", had a political message.

Kershaw's most commercially successful solo album, it peaked at No. 5 on the UK Albums Chart and reached the top 10 in several other countries, including Germany, Finland, and Norway. The album spawned four charting singles in the United Kingdom. "Wouldn't It Be Good" peaked at No. 4 on the UK Singles Chart; "Dancing Girls" peaked at No. 13; "I Won't Let the Sun Go Down on Me" at No. 2; "Human Racing" at No. 19. Human Racing was the 22nd best-selling album of 1984 in the UK and received a nomination for Best British Album at the 1985 Brit Awards. The album has been certified platinum by the British Phonographic Industry (BPI).

The album was re-released on 27 February 2012, on Universal's new Re-presents imprint featuring rare bonus content. The reissue is a 2-CD set with the original album digitally remastered from the original 1/2" mix tapes; the bonus content consists of associated 12" mixes and B-sides including a previously unreleased version of "Bogart", a special brass mix of "Shame on You" and a live version of "Cloak and Dagger" recorded at the Hammersmith Odeon.

Critical reception
Smash Hits magazine gave the album a highly negative review, awarding it 1 out of 10, and calling it "Competent but relentlessly dull synthesised meanderings of no importance to anyone but Mr Kershaw himself (and even he doesn't sound that interested)." Reviewing retrospectively for AllMusic, critic Scott Bultman wrote of the album: "His debut, although rough around the edges, showed talent and promise."

Track listing

Additional tracks

Personnel
Credits are adapted from the album's liner notes.

Musicians
 Nik Kershaw – lead and background vocals; vocal percussion and effects; guitar; bass guitar; keyboards; percussion
 Paul "Wix" Wickens – keyboards; Fairlight CMI
 Charlie Morgan – drums
 Reg Webb – keyboards
 Nick Glennie-Smith – keyboards
 Don Snow – keyboards
 Paul Westwood – additional bass guitar on "I Won't Let the Sun Go Down on Me"
 Martin Ditcham – percussion
 Jerry Hey – horns
 Gary Grant – horns
 Larry Williams – horns
 Bill Reichenbach – horns
 Kim Hutchcroft – horns
 Sheri Kershaw – backing vocals on "Faces"
 Lynda Hayes – voice-over on "Bogart"

Production and artwork
 Peter Collins – producer
 Julian Mendelsohn – engineer; mixer
 Stuart Bruce – assistant engineer
 Keith Finney – assistant engineer
 Bob Kraushaar – assistant engineer
 Roger Howorth – assistant engineer
 Nick Campey – assistant engineer
 Greg Fulginiti – mastering

Charts

Weekly charts

Year-end charts

Certifications

References

External links
 

1984 debut albums
Albums produced by Peter Collins (record producer)
MCA Records albums
Nik Kershaw albums